Thomas Sale may refer to:

 Tommy Sale (1910–1990), English footballer
 Tommy Sale (rugby league) (1918–2016), English rugby league footballer
 Thomas Sale (priest) (1865–1939), Archdeacon of Rochdale